Kirke Værløse is a small town located in the Furesø Municipality, in the Capital Region of Denmark. Kirke Værløse was originally the parish which the larger town of Værløse grew out of.

References

Cities and towns in the Capital Region of Denmark
Furesø Municipality